The Snake Temple (also called as the Temple of the Azure Cloud) is a Chinese temple situated in Bayan Lepas, Southwest Penang Island District, Penang, Malaysia. It was built in 1805 for Master Qingshui or Chor Soo Kong (祖師公), a deified Buddhist monk. Devotees from as far away as Singapore, Taiwan and China come to pray in the temple on the monk's birthday (the sixth day of the first lunar month).

The temple also featured during the 8th leg of The Amazing Race 16 and become a location in Tan Twan Eng's novel "The Gift of Rain" (book 1, chapter 4).

History 
The temple was constructed in the 1805 to honour Chor Soo Kong (also known as Master Qingshui), a Buddhist monk who lived during the Song dynasty (960–1279) for his numerous miracles and good deeds especially in healing the sick and giving shelter to snakes. When the temple structure was completed in the 1800s, snakes coming from the species of Wagler's pit viper reportedly appeared by themselves.

Features 
The temple is filled with the smoke of burning incense and a variety of pit vipers. The vipers are believed to be rendered harmless by the sacred smoke, but as a safety precaution, the snakes have been de-venomed but still have their fangs intact. Other species of snake also available in the temple. Visitors are warned against picking up the reptiles and placing them on their bodies to take pictures. Aside from the snakes, two brick wells known as the "Dragon Eye Wells/Dragon Pure Water Wells" are located inside the temple together with two giant brass bells. In 2005, a snake breeding centre was set up in the temple.

References

External links 
 

Chinese-Malaysian culture
Buddhist temples in Malaysia
Taoist temples in Malaysia
Religious buildings and structures in Penang
Religious buildings and structures completed in 1805
19th-century Buddhist temples